Laetitia Tignola (born 25 August 1972) is a French former judoka who competed in the 2000 Summer Olympics.

References

External links
 

1972 births
Living people
French female judoka
Olympic judoka of France
Judoka at the 2000 Summer Olympics
People from Les Sables-d'Olonne
Sportspeople from Vendée
21st-century French women